John Calhoun Sheppard (July 5, 1850October 17, 1931) was the 82nd governor of South Carolina from July 10, 1886, to November 30, 1886.

Sheppard was born in Edgefield County and attended Bethel Academy in Edgefield. Upon graduating from Furman University with a law degree, he was admitted to the bar in 1871. He was elected to the South Carolina House of Representatives in 1876 and became the Speaker of the House when his father-in-law, William Henry Wallace, resigned as Speaker to accept an open circuit judgeship. He had been a strong supporter of Martin Witherspoon Gary in his gubernatorial campaign of 1880 which got him noticed by those opposed to the Conservative wing of the state Democratic party.

In 1882, Sheppard was placed on the Democratic statewide ticket for the post of Lieutenant Governor and easily won election and reelection in 1884. When Hugh Smith Thompson resigned on July 10, 1886, to be Assistant Secretary of the Treasury, Sheppard succeeded to the governorship. In the nomination battle to be the Democratic nominee for governor in the election of 1886, he was promoted by Ben Tillman and the News and Courier. Tillman tried to force the delegates of the Farmers' Association to support Sheppard at the Democratic Convention, but they refused and instead John Peter Richardson III emerged as the nominee for governor.

After leaving the governorship on November 30, 1886, Sheppard became president of the Edgefield Bank of South Carolina. He was mentioned as a potential candidate for governor in 1890, but Tillman had rigged the Democratic convention to force his nomination for governor. Sheppard remained active in South Carolina politics and participated at the constitutional convention of 1895. He was elected three years later in 1898 to the South Carolina Senate and served until 1904.  In 1908, Sheppard was the president of the South Carolina Bar Association and was member of the state Senate for a second time from 1919 to 1920.

Sheppard died on October 17, 1931, aged 81. He was buried at Willowbrook Cemetery in Edgefield.

External links 

1850 births
1931 deaths
People from Edgefield County, South Carolina
Furman University alumni
Democratic Party governors of South Carolina
University of South Carolina trustees